Clavus acuminata is a species of sea snail, a marine gastropod mollusk in the family Drilliidae.

This is a species that needs further investigation (species inquirenda).

Description

Distribution

References

acuminata